Wyatt Reeder Toregas (born December 2, 1982) is an American former Major League Baseball (MLB) catcher who played for the Cleveland Indians in 2009 and for the Pittsburgh Pirates in 2011. He is also the former manager of the Mississippi Braves, the Double-A affiliate of the Atlanta Braves, and previously managed the West Virginia Black Bears, West Virginia Power, and Bradenton Marauders.

Playing career

Amateur career

High school
He attended South Lakes High School in Reston, Virginia where he excelled in wrestling, golf, and baseball.

College
After graduation from high school in 2001, Toregas played college baseball at Virginia Tech. In 2003, he played collegiate summer baseball with the Harwich Mariners of the Cape Cod Baseball League.

Pro career

Cleveland Indians
After being drafted by the Indians in 2004, Toregas played for the minor league teams Mahoning Valley Scrappers, Lake County Captains, Kinston Indians, Akron Aeros, and Columbus Clippers. A catcher and a  non-roster invitee to spring training with the Indians, Toregas throws and bats right-handed. He also attended Indians spring training in 2009 but returned to the Columbus Clippers on March 24, 2009. Toregas made his Major League debut and got his first hit in his first Major League at bat on August 1, 2009. Toregas was released by the Indians after the 2010 season.

Pittsburgh Pirates
Toregas signed a minor league contract with the Pittsburgh Pirates on January 18, 2011. The Pirates purchased his contract on June 9, adding him to the active roster. He was designated for assignment on June 13. After the 2011 season, he elected for free agency.

Coaching career
In November 2011, Toregas signed with the Pittsburgh Pirates as a player-coach; he served as the first base coach for the 2012 Indianapolis Indians. In January 2015, Toregas was named as the first manager in the franchise history of the Pirates' Short-Season-A affiliate, the West Virginia Black Bears. In March 2021, he was named as the manager of the Mississippi Braves, the Double-A affiliate of the Atlanta Braves.  On June 11, 2021, Toregas resigned as manager of the Mississippi Braves.  No reason or replacement has been announced.

Personal life
Toregas was raised in Ashburn, Virginia.

Toregas is a member of the Chickasaw Nation. He has Chickasaw heritage through his grandmother Jalna Wenonah Wolf Toregas, and his memories of her stories about the tribe led him to pursue official membership near the end of his playing career.

References

External links

Wyatt Toregas at Baseball America
Toregas article from letsgotribe.com

1982 births
Living people
21st-century Native Americans
Akron Aeros players
Baseball players from Virginia
Buffalo Bisons (minor league) players
Chickasaw people
Cleveland Indians players
Columbus Clippers players
Harwich Mariners players
Indianapolis Indians players
Kinston Indians players
Lake County Captains players
Mahoning Valley Scrappers players
Major League Baseball catchers
Native American sportspeople
People from Ashburn, Virginia
Pittsburgh Pirates players
Sportspeople from Fairfax, Virginia
Virginia Tech Hokies baseball players
West Virginia Power managers
American expatriate baseball players in the Dominican Republic
Azucareros del Este players
Bradenton Marauders managers
20th-century Native Americans